Chester Gap is a census-designated place (CDP) in Rappahannock and Warren counties, Virginia, United States. The population as of the 2010 Census was 839. The CDP is named for Chester Gap, the wind gap within which it is located.

References

Unincorporated communities in Virginia
Census-designated places in Rappahannock County, Virginia
Census-designated places in Virginia